Diplacodes pumila, the dwarf percher, is a species of dragonfly in the family Libellulidae. It is found in the Democratic Republic of the Congo, Mozambique, South Africa, Tanzania, Zambia, and Zimbabwe.    Its natural habitats are grassy margins of wetlands in moist savanna and grassland.

This species is similar to Diplacodes lefebvrii, the black percher, but is much smaller, the hindwing being 17–18 mm long; that of Diplacodes lefebvrii is usually 22–23 mm long.

References 

Libellulidae
Insects described in 2006